Kenneth Nicholson (born 7 August 1945) is a New Zealand former cricketer and journalist. He played one first-class and three List A matches for Otago between 1971 and 1973. Nicholson also played for Southland cricket team for 20 years. In November 1988, Nicholson, along with Jeremy Coney, were required to play as substitute fielders in New Zealand's Test match against India in Bangalore, after several members of the New Zealand team went down with illness.

See also
 List of Otago representative cricketers

References

External links
 

1945 births
Living people
New Zealand cricketers
Otago cricketers
People from Otautau